Ashley Slater (born 1961) is a British trombone player and best known for his narration on the television series Boo! as well as his work with Norman Cook (a.k.a. Fatboy Slim) in the band Freak Power.

Career
In 1983 after leaving the army, Slater attended the National Centre for Orchestral Studies, after which he joined the jazz orchestral collective Loose Tubes. Over the next few years he was the bass and tenor trombonist of choice for George Russell, Carla Bley, Andrew Poppy, El Sonido de Londres, Billy Jenkins, Django Bates and Andy Sheppard.

Discography

As leader
The Human Groove (1988), with Microgroove
Big Lounge (2002)
Cellophane (2008)

With Kitten & The Hip
Hello Kitten (2014)

With Freak Power
Drive-Thru Booty (1995)
More of Everything for Everybody (1996)

With Loose Tubes
 Loose Tubes (1985)
 Delightful Precipice (1986)
 Open Letter (1988)

With Kin Chi Kat
 You Think You Love Me (2019)

With others
Billy Jenkins, Scratches of Spain (1987)
George Russell, The London Concert (1990)
Carla Bley, The Very Big Carla Bley Band (1991)
Iain Ballamy, Mirrormask: Original Motion Picture Soundtrack (2005), Molecular Gastronomy (2007)
Dub Pistols, Back to Daylight from the Album Rum & Coke (2009)
Monkey Business, Id Song and London Dealing from the Album Twilight of Jesters? (2009)
Tape Five, Jambalaya (2022)

References

1961 births
Living people
British jazz trombonists
Male trombonists
British people of Canadian descent
21st-century trombonists
21st-century British male musicians
British male jazz musicians
Loose Tubes members
Oxcentrics members